A flail is an agricultural implement for threshing.

Flail may also refer to:
 Flail (weapon), a ball-on-a-chain bludgeon wielded with one hand by armored knights in single combat or medieval battles
 Flail, the cutting part in some designs of brush hog, stump grinder, and woodchipper
 Mine flail, a vehicle mounted device for removing land mines